Bellemont is an unincorporated community in Alamance County, North Carolina, United States.

The community is located at the junction with Bellemont Alamance/Mt. Hermon Road.

The Bellemont Mill Village Historic District and Kernodle-Pickett House are listed on the National Register of Historic Places.

Notable person 
 Leo Moon, Cleveland Indians pitcher

Belmont is located at 35°14′40″N 81°2′8″W / 35.24444°N 81.03556°W / 35.24444; -81.03556 (35.244496, -81.035650).

References

External links
 

Unincorporated communities in North Carolina
Unincorporated communities in Alamance County, North Carolina